Madhukar Krishna Naik (born 7 January 1926) is a scholar of Indian literature in English.

Selected publications
 W. Somerset Maugham: A Study in Conflict. University of Oklahoma Press, Norman, 1960.
 Raja Rao. Twayne Publishers, New York, 1972.
 Mulk Raj Anand. Arnold-Heinemann, New Delhi, 1973.
 Mighty Voices: Studies in T. S. Eliot. Arnold-Heinemann, New Delhi, 1980.
 A History of Indian English Literature. Sahitya Akademi, New Delhi, 1982. Revised edition 1989.
 The Ironic Vision: A Study of R. S. Narayan. Sterling Publishers, New Delhi, 1983.
 Dimensions of Indian English Literature. Sterling Publishers, New Delhi, 1984, 1985.
 Studies in Indian English Literature. Sterling Publishers, New Delhi, 1987.
 Mirror on the Wall: Images of Indian and the Englishman in Anglo-Indian Fiction. Sterling Publishers, New Delhi, 1991.
 The Englishman and India: Two Lectures on Anglo-Indian Fiction. Karnatak University, Dharwad, 1995.
 Twentieth Century Indian English Fiction. Pencraft International, New Delhi, 2004.
 Indian English Poetry: From the Beginnings upto 2000. Pencraft International, New Delhi, 2006.
 Indian English Literature: 1980-2000. Pencraft International, New Delhi, 2001. (With Shyainala A. Narayan)
 Imperial Embrace: Studies in Anglo-Indian Fiction. Abhinav Publishers, New Delhi, 2008.

References 

Possibly living people
1926 births
English literature academics